The Golden Bell Award for Best Television Series is one of the categories of the competition for the Taiwanese television production, Golden Bell Awards. It is presented annually by the Government Information Office, Taiwan. The first time that the television programs were first eligible to be awarded was in 1971.

Winners and nominees

TV Series program winners from 1971 to 1982 were not included in the list. For more information, see also: Golden Bell Awards list of winners

1980s
 1984: Star Knows My Heart
The Misty Rain of Jiangnan
That Tender Age

 1985: Porters
Rivers, Mountains, Spring Mornings
Star's Hometown

 1986: Cloud's Hometown
One Plum Blossom
The Blue and the Black

 1987: Another Sound
How Many Beautiful Sunsets
The Fortune Family

 1988: Father Forgive Me
Deep Garden
Xi Shi

 1989: Moment in Peking
The August Blossom
Return the Pearl to Thee

1990s
Note: Between 1993 and 1999, television and radio awards were presented in alternate years.

 1990: Spring Passes and Returns
The Wife-Chasing Trio
My Son Junxiao

 1991: Mute Wife
Biographies of Assassins: Jingke
The Last Imperial Love

 1992: The Four Brothers of Peking
Xueke
Tales About Qianlong

 1993: The Book and the Sword
Continued Fate of Love
Unforgettable Emotions

 1995: Brothers by Destiny
Tales About Cixi
Everlasting Like Earth and Heaven

 1997: The Daughter-in-Law to Persuade the World
This Life, This World
Romance of Taiwan
The First Clan
Flowers Fall, Flowers Bloom

 1999: Spring Is Like Stepmother's Heart
Dream of the Red Chamber
Love Is Payable
God Loves Good People
Salt Farm Children

2000s
 2000: Ever
 Relatives Don't Bicker
 The Defeated Name
 State of Divinity
 A Boat in the Ocean

 2001: Crouching Tiger, Hidden Dragon
 Rogue Professor
 World Affectionate
 Big Hospital, Little Doctors
 Beigang Censer

 2002: Bi Ya Su Na
 True Love
 The Sun Shines on the Back of the Mountain First
 Chaste Woman, Fierce Woman, Carefree Woman
 The Cold Night

 2003: Crystal Boys
 New Bud
 Jingui
 Friends
 Home

 2004: Banquet
 Two Fish Swimming Ashore
 Dana Sakura
 Wintry Night II
 The Rose

 2005: A Cinematic Journey
A Story of Soldiers
Love's Lone Flower
Fifi
Say Yes Enterprise

 2006: Holy Ridge
Lovelorn High Heels
Bump Off Lover
A..S..T..
Spring in Grass Mount

 2007: Dangerous Mind
The Chinese Money Tree Blooms
The Beautiful Sunrise
The Hospital
Life Away from Home

 2008: Fated to Love You
Wayward Kenting
Mom's House
Tobacco Field Youths
Huang Jinxian

 2009: Black & White
Justice for Love
Police et vous
My Queen
Marriage for Three Women

2010s
 2010: Moonlight of Brotherhood
 Rock Baby
 Hi My Sweetheart
 The Kite Soaring
 Year of the Rain

 2011: Somewhere over the Sky
 The Fierce Wife
 Scent of Love
 The Invaluable Treasure 1949
 Love You

 2012: In Time with You
 Man Boy
 Garden of Life
 Innocence
 Way Back into Love

 2013: Falling
 Flavor of Life
 End of Innocence
 An Innocent Mistake
 Home

 2014: Boys Can Fly
 Amour et Patisserie
 In a Good Way
 Sun After the Rain
 Lonely River

 2015: The Way We Were
C.S.I.C.: I Hero
Apple in Your Eye
Long Day's Journey into Light
Brave Forward

 2016: A Touch of Green
Ba Ji Teenagers
Marry Me, or Not?
Sunset
The Best of Youth

 2017: Close Your Eyes Before It's Dark
Abula
Game
Love of Sandstorm
Family Time

 2018: A Boy Named Flora A
Songs and the City
Roseki
Wake Up 2
Age Of Rebellion

 2019: The World Between Us
Utopia For The 20s
Survive
A Taste to Remember
A Taiwanese Tale of Two Cities

2020s
 2020: Someday Or One Day
Yong-jiu Grocery Store
 The Victims' Game
 Hate The Sin, Love The Sinner
 The Mirror

 2021: The Magician on the Skywalk
U Motherbaker
 Girls Win
 Animal Whisper
 Stay for Love

 2022: Seqalu: Formosa 1867
 The Making of an Ordinary Woman 2
 Gold Leaf
 Danger Zone
 Light the Night

References

Television Series, Best